Gravity Is My Enemy is a 1977 American short documentary film about quadriplegic visual artist Mark Hicks, directed by John C. Joseph. It won an Oscar at the 50th Academy Awards in 1978 for Documentary Short Subject.

Cast
 Mark Hicks, as himself
 Jan Stussy, as himself

References

External links

1977 films
1977 short films
1977 documentary films
1970s short documentary films
American short documentary films
Best Documentary Short Subject Academy Award winners
American independent films
Documentary films about painters
Documentary films about people with disability
1977 independent films
1970s English-language films
1970s American films